Spencer County is a county located in the U.S. state of Indiana.  As of the 2010 census, the population was 20,952.  The county seat is Rockport. Despite not being in the Owensboro Metropolitan Area, the entire riverfront of the city of Owensboro, Kentucky borders the  southern tip of the county.

History
Spencer County was formed in 1818 from parts of Warrick County and Perry County. It was named for Captain Spier Spencer, killed at the Battle of Tippecanoe in 1811. He was also the namesake for Spencer, Indiana, the county seat of Owen County.

Abraham Lincoln lived in Spencer County from 1816 to 1830, between the ages of seven and twenty-one. Originally, the area his family settled in was in Perry County with Spencer County being formed almost two years later. His family moved to Illinois in 1830.  The Lincoln Boyhood National Memorial is located at the site of the Lincoln family farm.  In addition, the graves of his mother Nancy Lincoln and sister Sarah Lincoln Grigsby are located in Spencer County.

On December 16, 1900, two African-American men, Bud Rowlands and Jim Henderson, were lynched by the county courthouse in Rockport after being arrested as suspects in the brutal robbery and killing of a white barber at 2 am the night before. A mob estimated at 1,500 broke open the jail and took them out, hanging them from a tree by the courthouse, and shooting their bodies numerous times. John Rolla was accused by Rowlands as a suspect and also lynched. This was the second-highest number of lynchings in the state, though it pales in comparison to lynchings in Southern states.

The current Spencer County courthouse was built in 1921. It is the fifth courthouse to serve the county.

County attractions include the town of Santa Claus, Holiday World & Splashin' Safari, and Santa's Candy Castle.

Saint Meinrad Archabbey is located at the northeastern corner of Spencer County.

Geography

Cities and towns
ZIP Codes are in parentheses.
 Chrisney (47611)
 Dale (47523)
 Gentryville (47537)
 Grandview (47615)
 Richland City (47634)
 Rockport (47635)
 Santa Claus (47579)

Census-designated place
 St. Meinrad (47577)

Other unincorporated places

 Africa
 Bloomfield
 Buffaloville
 Centerville
 Clay City
 Enterprise
 Eureka
 Evanston (47531)
 Fulda (47531)
 Hatfield (47617)
 Huffman
 Kennedy
 Kercheval
 Lamar (47550)
 Liberal
 Lincoln City (47552)
 Mariah Hill (47556)
 Maxville
 Midway
 New Boston
 Newtonville
 Patronville
 Pigeon
 Pueblo
 Pyeattville
 Reo
 Ritchie
 Rock Hill
 Sand Ridge
 Santa Fe
 Schley
 Silverdale

Townships

 Carter
 Clay
 Grass
 Hammond
 Harrison
 Huff
 Jackson
 Luce
 Ohio

Adjacent counties
 Dubois County  (north/ET Boundary)
 Daviess County, Kentucky  (south)
 Perry County  (east)
 Hancock County, Kentucky  (southeast)
 Warrick County (west)

Major highways
  Interstate 64
  U.S. Route 231
  Indiana State Road 62
  Indiana State Road 66
  Indiana State Road 68
  Indiana State Road 70
  Indiana State Road 161
  Indiana State Road 162
  Indiana State Road 245
  Indiana State Road 545

National protected area
 Lincoln Boyhood National Memorial

Climate and weather 

Government

The county government is a constitutional body, and is granted specific powers by the Constitution of Indiana, and by the Indiana Code.

County Council: The county council is the legislative branch of the county government and controls all the spending and revenue collection in the county. Representatives are elected from county districts. The council members serve four-year terms. They are responsible for setting salaries, the annual budget, and special spending. The council also has limited authority to impose local taxes, in the form of an income and property tax that is subject to state level approval, excise taxes, and service taxes.

Board of Commissioners: The executive body of the county is made of a board of commissioners. The commissioners are elected county-wide, in staggered terms, and each serves a four-year term. One of the commissioners, typically the most senior, serves as president. The commissioners are charged with executing the acts legislated by the council, collecting revenue, and managing the day-to-day functions of the county government.

Court: The county maintains a small claims court that can handle some civil cases. The judge on the court is elected to a term of four years and must be a member of the Indiana Bar Association. The judge is assisted by a constable who is also elected to a four-year term. In some cases, court decisions can be appealed to the state level circuit court.

County Officials: The county has several other elected offices, including sheriff, coroner, auditor, treasurer, recorder, surveyor, and circuit court clerk. Each of these elected officers serves a term of four years and oversees a different part of county government. Members elected to county government positions are required to declare party affiliations and to be residents of the county.

Spencer County is part of Indiana's 8th congressional district and is represented in Congress by Republican Larry Bucshon.

Demographics

As of the 2010 United States Census, there were 20,952 people, 8,082 households, and 5,907 families residing in the county. The racial makeup of the county was 96.9% White, 0.5% Black or African American, 0.3% Asian, 0.2% American Indian, 1.3% from other races, and 0.8% from two or more races. Those of Hispanic or Latino origin made up 2.5% of the population. In terms of ancestry, 47.0% were German, 16.4% were Irish, 12.6% were English, and 11.1% were American.

Of the 8,082 households, 33.5% had children under the age of 18 living with them, 60.8% were married couples living together, 8.1% had a female householder with no husband present, 26.9% were non-families, and 23.2% of all households were made up of individuals. The average household size was 2.55 and the average family size was 3.00. The median age was 41.9 years.

The median income for a household in the county was $47,697 and the median income for a family was $61,365. Males had a median income of $44,526 versus $30,466 for females. The per capita income for the county was $23,609. About 6.8% of families and 12.1% of the population were below the poverty line, including 18.0% of those under age 18 and 12.8% of those age 65 or over.

Notable people
It is the birthplace of H. Justin Davidson, Ken Dilger, Del Harris, Florence Henderson, Roger Kaiser, Bill Peet, Brig General Thomas Gamble Pitcher, and Howard Schnellenberger. Another notable figure that grew up here was Abraham Lincoln, who was the 16th President of the United States.

See also
 List of public art in Spencer County, Indiana
 National Register of Historic Places listings in Spencer County, Indiana

References

 
Indiana counties
1818 establishments in Indiana
Populated places established in 1818
Southwestern Indiana
Indiana counties on the Ohio River